Zahari Sirakov (born 8 October 1977) is a Bulgarian football coach and a former player. He is the manager of Ludogorets Razgrad III.

Career
Sirakov started his career with Levski Kyustendil, but made a name for himself in Bulgaria while playing for Levski Sofia. On 24 September 1999, he scored a last-minute goal against Litex Lovech in an A Group match to bring the score to 1–1 in the heated derby encounter, prompting a brief pitch invasion by joyous Levski supporters. Sirakov was also notable for his sportsmanship, on one occasion shaking the hand of referee Atanas Uzunov after receiving a red card in a match against CSKA Sofia. He has remained popular with Bulgarian supporters even after starting his Russian adventures.

In February 2004, Sirakov signed with Russian club Amkar Perm. After more than 11 years with Amkar, Sirakov ended his career at the end of 2014–15 season.

International career
Sirakov made his debut for Bulgaria against Poland on 6 September 1998, but received his second cap in 2007 during UEFA Euro 2008 qualifying. In August 2010, he earned a recall to the national side due to an injury suffered by Georgi Sarmov and on 11 August 2010, he came on as a substitute in the 0–1 away loss in a friendly match against Russia.

Honours

Club
PFC Levski Sofia
 Champion of Bulgaria -2000,2001
 Bulgarian Cup 1998, 2000

APOEL 
Cypriot Super Cup : 2002

References

External links
Profile at Amkar 
 

1977 births
People from Smolyan
Living people
Bulgarian footballers
Bulgaria under-21 international footballers
Bulgaria international footballers
Association football defenders
PFC Velbazhd Kyustendil players
PFC Levski Sofia players
PFC Spartak Pleven players
APOEL FC players
FC Lokomotiv 1929 Sofia players
PFC Rodopa Smolyan players
FC Amkar Perm players
First Professional Football League (Bulgaria) players
Cypriot First Division players
Russian Premier League players
Bulgarian expatriate footballers
Expatriate footballers in Russia
Bulgarian expatriate sportspeople in Russia
Expatriate footballers in Cyprus
Bulgarian expatriate sportspeople in Cyprus
Bulgarian football managers